The Sikkim keelback (Herpetoreas sieboldii) is a species of grass snake in the family Colubridae. The species is endemic to South Asia and Myanmar. It is closely related to the Himalayan keelback, and some treat this species as a synonym (Tillack 2003).

Geographic range
H. sieboldii is found in Bangladesh, Bhutan, India (Punjab, Sikkim, Uttar Pradesh), Myanmar (formerly called Burma), Nepal, and Pakistan.

Etymology
The specific name, sieboldii, is in honor of German zoologist Karl Theodor Ernst von Siebold.

Reproduction
H. sieboldii is oviparous.

References

Further reading
Günther A (1860). "Contributions to a Knowledge of the Reptiles of the Himalaya Mountains". Proc. Zool. Soc. London 1860: 148–175. (Herpetoreas sieboldii, new species, pp. 156–157).
Günther A (1864). The Reptiles of British India. London: The Ray Society. (Taylor & Francis, printers).  xxvii + 452 pp. (Herpetoreas sieboldii, pp. 257–258).
Kramer E (1977). "Zur Schlangenfauna Nepals ". Rev. suisse Zool. 84 (3): 721–761. (in German).
Malnate EV (1966).  "Amphiesma platyceps (Blyth) and Amphiesma sieboldii (Günther): sibling species (Reptilia: Serpentes)". J. Bombay Nat. Hist. Soc. 63 (1): 1–17.
Theobald W (1868). "Catalogue of Reptiles in the Museum of the Asiatic Society of Bengal". J. Asiatic Soc. Bengal, Calcutta 37 (extra number 146): (2), vi + 7-88.
Theobald W (1876). Descriptive Catalogue of the Reptiles of British India. Calcutta: Thacker, Spink & Co. xiii + 238 pp.
Tillack F (2003). "Über die Verbreitung und Biologie der Himalaya-Gebirgswassernatter Amphiesma platyceps (Blyth 1854) und einen Fall von Amphigonia retardata (Serpentes: Colubridae: Natricinae)". Sauria 25 (1): 21–27. (in German).

Herpetoreas
Reptiles described in 1860
Taxa named by Albert Günther
Reptiles of India
Reptiles of Bangladesh
Reptiles of Myanmar
Reptiles of Nepal
Reptiles of Pakistan